Irene Roberts (24 September 1908 – 6 February 1996) better known by her professional name Renee Roberts was an English actress who is best remembered for her portrayal of Miss Ursula Gatsby in Fawlty Towers in both series in 1975 and 1979.

She made numerous television appearances in Britain, starting in the 1960s.

Personal life
She was married to the actor Ronald Frankau. Her daughter, Rosemary Frankau, was also an actress.

References

External links

1908 births
1996 deaths
English television actresses
20th-century British actresses
British comedy actresses
20th-century English women
20th-century English people
Frankau family